New Obscurantis Order is the third album by the French symphonic black metal band Anorexia Nervosa.

Track listing
 "Mother Anorexia"
 "Châtiment De La Rose" (Eng: Chastisement of the Rose)
 "Black Death, Nonetheless"
 "Stabat Mater Dolorosa"
 "Le Portail De La Vierge" (Eng: The Virgin's Portal)
 "The Altar of Holocausts"
 "Hail Tyranny" (Rachmaninov Cover(Actual song called Prelude in C# Minor op. 3 no. 2))
 "Ordo Ab Chao - The Scarlet Communion"
 "Solitude" (Candlemass Cover) (*)
 "Metal Meltdown" (Judas Priest Cover) (**)

(*) 'Limited Edition' and 'Limited LP' version only.
(**) 'Limited LP' version only.

Anorexia Nervosa (band) albums
2001 albums
Osmose Productions albums